The Volvo 164 is a 4-door, 6-cylinder luxury sedan unveiled by Volvo at the Paris Motor Show early in October 1968 and first sold as a 1969 model. 46,008 164s were built before the car was succeeded by the 264 in 1975. The 164 was Volvo's first venture into the luxury segment since the end of PV 60 production in 1950, and was the first six-cylinder Volvo since the PV800 last produced in 1958.

History
Jan Wilsgaard designed what would eventually become the 164 in the late 1950s as a concept car called the P358 and powered by a V8 engine. The front styling was inspired both by the Wolseley 6/99 and the Volvo P1900., more so by the Ferrari 375 Agnelli, which influenced the Jaguar XJ as well.

In 1968 Volvo introduced the 164 as a luxury version of their 140 series. The wings, the grille, the front bumper, the bonnet, the headlamp bezels, and the front indicators were all unique to the 164; to accommodate the long 3-litre 6-cylinder engine the 164's wings and bonnet were longer than those of the 4-cylinder 140, but the overall height and width of the 164 were the same as the 140 series. The interior featured a simulated woodgrain dashboard face and leather seating surfaces. Introduced the same year as the BMW E3, the 164 was Volvo's answer to the Mercedes-Benz 250 and Jaguar XJ6. The 164 compared favourably in terms of fuel economy with similarly sized 6-cylinder European cars such as the BMW 530.

in 1972 an update saw the introduction of fuel injection to the 164 with the B30E (high compression) and B30F (low compression) engines which utilised Bosch D-Jetronic injection. Also for 1972 the dash was slightly revised with he introduction of a centre console and some of the dash switches, as well as the clock, were moved to it as well as being redesigned. The flush mounted pull style door handles also appeared for the 1972 model year.

In 1973 the 164 received a major facelift including new rear and side lamps, a new grille and front bumper, and a new instrument cluster and dashboard which included air ducts. 

In 1974 the doors were revised and strengthened and the vent wings were eliminated due to the panel vents introduced in 1973, and the 164 became one of the earliest cars to offer heated seats. The instrument cluster changed slightly with the introduction of the bulb failure indicator and  the fuel gauge received revised markings with the 1/2 mark moved to the centre of the gauge and the red reserve section shrinking significantly. Underneath, the floor pan was revised and the fuel tank was moved from the boot floor to closer to the rear axle for better protection in the case of an accident.  

A limited edition of the 164, the 164TE was made only in 1974 and only for 3 markets, Great Britain, Germany and Australia. The 164TE had extra accessories fitted as standard, being air conditioning, 4 speaker 8 track player with radio, headlight wipe/wash system, rear head rests, rear reading lamps and a fully carpeted boot with lighting. This more upmarket version was only available in 3 colours, being metallic light blue (colour 111), metallic copper (colour 105) and metallic teal (colour 115).

For 1975, the PRV engine was not available for the American market so the 164 was produced for one more year for the American and Japanese markets only although a few were sold . The 164 received new larger 6-panel rear lamps sometime during the 1975 model year, electronic ignition, new seats, electric windows in the front, a new style of badging, extensive changes to the rear suspension, and the parking brake handle was moved from outboard to inboard of the driving seat. Due to much of the changes coming from the 200 series, as the 200 series switched to metric bolt patterns, the 164 uses both imperial and metric bolt patterns on the car.

For 1975 (1976 in America and Japan) the 164 was replaced by the 264 which was powered by the PRV 2.7-liter V6 engine.

Engine and powertrain
The 164 was powered by a 3-litre overhead-valve B30 engine, a 6-cylinder derivative of the B20 4-cylinder engine that powered most other Volvo models.

1969–1971 models were all equipped with dual Zenith Stromberg 175CD2SE constant-depression carburettors. In 1972, Bosch's first volume-production electronic fuel injection system, D-Jetronic, was offered as optional equipment. Carburettors were dropped and "D-Jet" became standard equipment for the 1974 model year. Cars equipped with the fuel injection were badged as 164E models, the "E" standing for einspritzung (German for "injection"). Like other fuel-injected Volvos, the 164E models gave improved performance and driveability with less toxic exhaust than their carburettored counterparts.

Performance:

Volvo 164E  DIN. Acc 0–100 km/h 8.7 sec. Acc 0–160 km/h 24.4 sec. Top speed 193.5 km/h.

Volvo 164E automatic  DIN. Acc 0–100 km/h 11.9 sec. Acc 0–160 km/h 35.2 sec. Top speed 188 km/h.

References: Autozeitung nr 8-1972 and Autozeitung nr 1-1973.

Transmission
Transmission options included a manual 4-speed M400 gearbox, which was known as the M410 when equipped with the optional electrically operated Laycock de Normanville overdrive. Both the M400 and M410 had Volvo's "remote control" shift mechanism, which used a conventionally short, vertical shift stick placed between the front seats; manual-shift models other than the 164 and the P1800 continued until 1971 to use Volvo's direct-control shifter with an extremely long, almost horizontal shift lever with its pivot point well under the dashboard. A 3-speed automatic transmission, the BW35 made by Borg-Warner, was also offered. The automatic shift selector was mounted on the steering column from 1969 through 1971, and on the floor from 1972 through 1975. Despite its rough operation and inefficiency, the BW35 was popular in the North American and Australian markets.

Body and chassis
The 164 was offered only as a 4-door sedan, and shares many body and chassis components with the 144. From the cowl rearward, body sheetmetal is identical with the exception of the remote shifter transmission tunnel, which was added to the 140 series in 1972. The front of the 164 was extended 6 cm and the wheelbase gained 10 cm to accommodate the length of the 6-cylinder engine.

Descendants
When developing the Volvo 262C coupé in the mid-seventies, Volvo employed a 164 as a testbed. The resulting two-door "162" with a chopped and vinyl-covered roof—features that were eventually applied to the 262C—is on permanent display at the Volvo Museum in Gothenburg, Sweden. The current counterpart of the 164 is the Volvo S90 .

Gallery

See also
Volvo 140 Series
Volvo 200 Series

References

External links
 IMCDB: Volvo 164s in movies and TV shows
 Volvo 164 Club of Sweden
 Volvo Club UK
 Photo history of the design conception of the Volvo 164

164
Sedans
Luxury vehicles
Rear-wheel-drive vehicles
Cars introduced in 1968
1960s cars
1970s cars